Cavit Acar is a Turkish freestyle wrestler competing in the 65 kg division. He is a member of Ankara ASKI.

Career 
In 2021, he won the bronze medal in the men's 65 kg event at the 2021 European U23 Wrestling Championship held in Skopje, North Macedonia.

He competed in the 65kg event at the 2022 World Wrestling Championships held in Belgrade, Serbia.

References

External links 
 

Living people
Turkish male sport wrestlers
2000 births
21st-century Turkish people